Stephen David Okumu (born 15 September 1982) is a Kenyan former first-class cricketer.

Okumu was born at Kisumu in September 1982. He made what would be his only appearance in first-class cricket for Kenya against a touring India A side at Nairobi in September 2004. He was selected in the Kenyan side for their 2004 Intercontinental Cup match against Namibia in October, but was pressured by his club side Swamibapa to withdraw. With the regular Kenyan side striking, Okumu was selected again in the Kenyan side to face Scotland in the semi-final of the Intercontinental Cup in November, but did not make the starting eleven. A year later he was once more called up to the Kenya squad to face Canada in the semi-final of the 2005 Intercontinental Cup, but once again did not make the starting eleven.

References

External links

1982 births
Living people
People from Kisumu County
Kenyan cricketers